The Cornell Notes system (also Cornell note-taking system, Cornell method, or Cornell way) is a note-taking system devised in the 1950s by Walter Pauk, an education professor at Cornell University. Pauk advocated its use in his best-selling book How to Study in College.

Overview

The Cornell method provides a systematic format for condensing and organizing notes. This system of taking notes is designed for use by a high school or college level student. There are several ways of taking notes, but one of the most common is the "two-column" notes style. The student divides the paper into two columns: the note-taking column (usually on the right) is twice the size of the questions/keyword column, which is on the left.

Notes from a lecture or text are written in the note-taking column; notes usually consist of the main ideas of the text or lecture, and longer ideas are paraphrased. Long sentences are avoided; symbols or abbreviations are used instead. To assist with future reviews, relevant questions or keywords (which should be recorded as soon as possible, so that the lecture and questions will be fresh in the student's mind) are written in the left-hand keyword column. These notes can be taken from any source of information, such as fiction books, DVDs, lectures, or textbooks, etc.

When reviewing the material, the student can cover the note-taking (right) column while answering the questions/keywords in the key word or cue (left) column. The student is encouraged to reflect on the material and review the notes regularly.

Studies on effectiveness
A study published in 2010 by Wichita State University compared two note-taking methods in a secondary English classroom, and found that the Cornell note-taking style may be of added benefit in cases where students are required to synthesize and apply learned knowledge, while the guided notes method appeared to be better for basic recall.

Another study, published in the summer of 2013, found that "Students who were taught CN (Cornell notes) did take better notes than those who were not, but they did not have higher achievement results." The study also stated that "Through analysis of assessment scores, [we] found no significant difference between the intervention and base classes on achievement."

Cornell note-taking can give students an effectiveness in organization of thoughts that they have been taught and give a better review in recollecting all the information that they have learned. The Cornell system is not only a fast method of writing notes but also the note taker is able to absorb the information that is given at a faster rate.

This method can improve student's studying and listening skills.

See also 
Note-taking

References

External links

   PDF
 Cornell Notes - How to Take Better Notes and Study More Effectively

Cornell Notes templates 
 Cornell Note-taking Lined Paper PDF Generator  Incompetech.com
 Make Your Cornell Notes Template with Word  Anne Hennegar, TimeAtlas.com, 2017. Includes video, Word template and PDF
 Cornell Notes Notion Template

Note-taking
Cornell University